St. Teresa's Church is a Roman Catholic church in Kowloon Tong, Hong Kong.

History
St. Teresa's Church was established on 23 April 1932.

See also
 List of Catholic churches in Hong Kong
 St. Teresa's School Kowloon
 St. Teresa Secondary School

References

Further reading

External links

 Pictures of St. Teresa's Church (Hong Kong)

Roman Catholic churches in Hong Kong
Grade I historic buildings in Hong Kong
Kowloon City District
Kowloon Tong